Reginald James Myles (1924 – 8 November 1997) was an Irish sprinter. He competed in the men's 4 × 400 metres relay at the 1948 Summer Olympics.

References

1924 births
1997 deaths
Athletes (track and field) at the 1948 Summer Olympics
Irish male sprinters
Olympic athletes of Ireland